ACT College, was a private career college in northern Virginia. specializing in Allied health career training. On April 3, 2012, ACT College's website announced that the college was now closed.  

The college had been on the U.S. Department of Education's list of institutions with low financial responsibility scores. The school was denied approval to continue to receive federal aid in March 2012.

The allied health programs were accredited by the [[Accrediting Bureau of Health Education Schools], and approved by the State Council of Higher Education for Virginia (SCHEV).

Footnotes

External links
 Official ACT College website

Northern Virginia
Private universities and colleges in Virginia
Educational institutions established in 1983
Education in Arlington County, Virginia
North Arlington, Virginia
Bull Run, Virginia
Education in Alexandria, Virginia
1983 establishments in Virginia